Knowledge Network Miner (KnetMiner) is an ecosystem of tools used to integrate, search and visualise biological Knowledge Graphs (KGs). KnetMiner KGs are built using the company’s data integration platform KnetBuilder and provided in OXL, Neo4j and RDF graph formats. The KnetMiner API provides web endpoints to search the KG with genes and keywords, returning the knowledge in graph format. Candidate genes are ranked according to their strength of association with particular search terms. KnetMiner was initially created by a collaboration of researchers at Rothamsted Research and has since expanded and initiated a spin-out process. KnetMiner filed for the KnetMiner trademark on 25 November 2021 and was entered into the register on 06 May 2022.

KnetMiner aims to enable scientists to search across large biological databases and literature to find links between genes, traits, diseases, and other information types. It makes use of FAIR data principles and supports the use of a range of biological data formats.

Current KnetMiners (non exhaustive list)  

KnetMiner hosts a range of different species, including a knowledge graph dedicated to SARS-CoV-2 in response to the 2020 global pandemic, on Rothamsted Research HPC machines, which include the following:

 Triticum aestivum - available here
 Arabidopsis Thaliana - available here
 Oryza Saiva Japonica - available here
 SARS-CoV-2 - available here
 Fusarium graminearum - available here
 Fusarium culmorum - available here
 Zymoseptoria tritici - available here
KnetMiner has been involved in a number of studies, including studies for wheat, willow, and SARS-CoV-2. It is also being used for exploring pathogen-host interactions in collaboration with PHI-base, soybean loopers, and other species.

API access 
KnetMiner provides REST API access to obtain either JSON outputs of each view type, or to obtain network views for certain searches.

Funding 
KnetMiner is funded by the Biotechnology and Biological Sciences Research Council, a UK research council.

References 

Data analysis software
Genetics articles needing attention